Sydney Smith (1771–1845) was an English writer and clergyman.

Sydney Smith may also refer to:
 Sydney Smith (Australian politician) (1856–1934)
 Sydney Smith (composer) (1839–1889), English composer
 Sydney Smith (British politician) (1885–1984), Labour MP for Hull South West 1945–1950 
 Sydney Smith (cricketer, born 1881) (1881–1963), Trinidad and Tobago cricketer who played for West Indies and New Zealand
 Sydney Smith (cricketer, born 1892), English cricketer
 Sydney Smith (footballer) (1875–?), English football player for Liverpool FC
 Sir Sydney Smith (forensic expert) (1883–1969), New Zealander and Scottish scientist
 Sydney Smith (illustrator) (fl. 2010s–2020s), Canadian illustrator
 Sydney Bernard Smith (1936–2008), Scots-Irish poet, dramatist, actor and novelist
 Sydney Ernest Smith (1881–1943), English pioneer aviator, soldier and company director
 Sydney George Smith (c. 1879–1943), New Zealand politician 
 Sydney Goodsir Smith (1915–1975), New Zealand-born Scottish poet and artist 
 Sydney Howard Smith (1872–1947), British badminton and tennis player
 Sydney John Smith (1892–1976), Canadian politician
 Sydney M. Smith (1869–1948), Chief Justice of the Supreme Court of Mississippi
 Sydney Philip Smith (1896–1918), World War I flying ace
 Sydney Ure Smith (1887–1949), Australian arts publisher and promoter 
 Sydney Wigham Smith (c. 1866–1933), architect in Melbourne, Australia
 Sydney Smith (1884–1958), English photographer whose work is found in the Beck Isle Museum
 Sir Sidney Smith (Royal Navy officer) (1764–1840), often written as "Sydney Smith", admiral who served in the American and French revolutionary wars and the Napoleonic Wars

See also
 Syd Smith (baseball) (1883–1961), American baseball player and college football coach
 Sidney Smith (disambiguation)
 Sid Smith (disambiguation)